David Marsh Kelly (February 11, 1841disappeared January 21, 1916) was an American lawyer and Republican politician.  He was the 29th speaker of the Wisconsin State Assembly and also served in the Wisconsin State Senate, representing Brown County.  He disappeared mysteriously in 1916 and was never heard from again.

Biography
Kelly was born on February 11, 1841, in Hamilton, Massachusetts. After serving with the Union Army during the American Civil War, he moved to Appleton, Wisconsin, in 1867 before settling in Green Bay, Wisconsin, the following year.

Legislative career
After having been a member in 1877 and 1878, Kelly was Speaker of the Assembly in 1879. From 1880 to 1881, he represented the 2nd District in the Senate. He was a Republican.

Kelly returned to Massachusetts in 1884, and in February 1916 was reported to have disappeared in that state, having last been seen in his office in Boston, from which he was thought to be taking a train to his home in Sharon, Massachusetts. He was not found despite an intensive search, including hired detectives, and in September of that year members of his Civil War regiment discussed his disappearance at their annual reunion. Linwood Cemetery, Massachusetts has a cenotaph memorial to Kelly.

See also
List of people who disappeared

References

1841 births
1910s missing person cases
Missing person cases in Massachusetts
People from Hamilton, Massachusetts
Politicians from Appleton, Wisconsin
Politicians from Green Bay, Wisconsin
Speakers of the Wisconsin State Assembly
Republican Party members of the Wisconsin State Assembly
Republican Party Wisconsin state senators
Year of death missing